The Akaflieg Stuttgart fs17 was a glider aircraft that was designed and built in Germany from 1936. It notably featured a prone seating position for its pilot.

Development
Realising that aircraft form drag is directly related to cross-sectional area of bodies moving through the air, the students of Akaflieg Stuttgart (Akademische Fliegergruppe – academic flying group) investigated methods of reducing the cross-sectional area of fuselage bodies, including the prone-position pilot, where the pilot lies horizontally with his body roughly parallel to the longitudinal axis of the fuselage. They noted an additional benefit of such a configuration is the pilot's increased resistance to the effects of 'g'. With very little previous research to take advantage of Akaflieg Stuttgart designed the FS 17 glider for flight trials of prone position cockpits.
The fs17 was an all-wood low-wing cantilever monoplane with emphasis on good low-speed flight characteristics, to reduce the risk to the pilot in stalling accidents, and a maximum load factor of 14g. The fuselage was designed with increased stiffness, to provide increased crash protection for the pilot, and the wing leading edges formed torsion boxes. The pilot lay above the wing centre section under an extensively glazed canopy.

Specifications

References

Further reading

1930s German sailplanes
Glider aircraft
Prone pilot aircraft
Aircraft first flown in 1938
Akaflieg Stuttgart aircraft